From List of National Natural Landmarks, these are the National Natural Landmarks in Texas.  There are 20 in total.

Texas
Texas geography-related lists